MeeWha Alana Lee (born December 31, 1958) is a Korean American actor and visual artist. She is best known for her roles in The Chair (2021 TV series) and Umma (2022 film).

Early life 
Lee was born in Masan, South Korea. She received her BFA degree from Seoul National University. She moved to the United States in 1982, receiving her MFA degree in Design and Drawing from the University of Iowa.

Art and design 
Lee was a college graphic design professor and a brand design strategy executive for three global corporations.  Her background in industrial and graphic design allowed her to participate in product and packaging development, which led to many US and global patents.

During and after her time in these careers, she has exhibited her design and studio art internationally. She curated an exhibition of Korean poster design that brought the works of 19 of Korea's leading graphic designers to a global audience and also exhibited and lectured on her own work in brand design. Her paintings have been shown in solo and group exhibitions around the United States and abroad. In 2021, she won the Butler Institute of American Art Award for her oil painting.

Acting career 
Lee came to acting late, as a way to honor the memory of her younger son, Alan, a film student who died in 2014.

She gained attention in movies such as Five Stars and on the stage.  Her performance as a loving but stern grandmother in Parked in America garnered praise for her portrayal of a "wise advisor" to the main character.

In 2021, she appeared in the Netflix series, The Chair with Sandra Oh, harkening back to her academic career. According to Lee, she was cast in part because Oh wanted her to help "tell the story of academia, immigrants, women and especially women of color.”

In 2022, she played the title role in the Sam Raimi film, Umma opposite Sandra Oh and Fivel Stewart. While her performance was lauded, the film was met with mixed reviews, many of which criticized the use of Korean imagery as "other".

Personal life 
Having lived in Iowa and Wisconsin for many years, she now resides in New York with her husband, Richard Masters, a coin designer for the US Mint.

Theater

Filmography

Television

Film

Music videos

References

External links

1958 births
Living people
American actresses of Korean descent
American artists of Korean descent
Korean emigrants to the United States